Liorhyssus hyalinus is a species of scentless plant bugs belonging to the family Rhopalidae, subfamily Rhopalinae.

Synonyms 

 Corizus gracilis Herrich-Schäffer, 1835 Liorhyssus gracilis (Herrich-Schäffer, 1835)
 Corizus capensis Germar, 1838. Liorhyssus capensis (Germar, 1838)
 Rhopalus bengalensis Dallas, 1852 Liorhyssus bengalensis (Dallas, 1852)
 Merocoris maculiventris Spinola, 1852 Liorhyssus maculiventris (Spinola, 1852)
 Merocoris microtomus Spinola, 1852Liorhyssus microtomus (Spinola, 1852)
 Corizus dilatipennis Signoret, 1859 Liorhyssus  dilatipennis (Signoret, 1859)
 Corizus lugens Signoret, 1859Liorhyssus lugens (Signoret, 1859)
 Corizus marginatus Jakovlev, 1871 ; Liorhyssus marginatus (Jakovlev, 1871)
 Corizus (Liorhyssus) hyalinus var. nigrinus Puton, 1881 Liorhyssus nigrinus (Puton, 1881)
 Liorhyssus natalensis var. corallinus Horváth, 1911 Liorhyssus corallinus (Horváth, 1911)
 Corizus imperialis Distant, 1918Liorhyssus imperialis (Distant, 1918)

Distribution

This species can be found in most of Europe, in Africa, Australia, Northern Asia, Middle America, North America, Oceania, South America and Southern Asia.

Description
The basic body color varies from yellow-brown to red, but the upperside of the abdomen is mainly dark. This species can be distinguished by the length of the hyaline membrane of the hemelytra, which extends beyond the black upperside of the abdomen. There are two black spots at the extremity of the pronotum. These bugs are rather similar to Rhopalus and Stictopleurus species.

Biology
Adults are present all year around. As the whole Rhopalidae family, this species a plant feeder. It mainly feeds on Compositae and Erodium species.

Bibliography
Dolling W.R., 2004 - Superfamily Coreoidea - Catalogue of the Heteroptera of the Palaearctic Region
Henry, Thomas J., and Richard C. Froeschner, eds. (1988), Catalog of the Heteroptera, or True Bugs, of Canada and the Continental United States

References

External links
 Biolib
 Encyclopedia of life

Rhopalini
Hemiptera of Europe
Insects described in 1794